Caroline Garcia and Kristina Mladenovic were the defending champions, but Garcia chose not to participate this year. Mladenovic played alongside Svetlana Kuznetsova, but lost in the first round to Kiki Bertens and Johanna Larsson.

Chan Yung-jan and Martina Hingis won their second Premier Mandatory title of the year, defeating Tímea Babos and Andrea Hlaváčková in the final, 6–4, 6–3.

Seeds
The top 4 seeds received a bye into the second round.

Draw

Finals

Top half

Bottom half

References
 Main Draw

Women's Doubles